Livré-la-Touche is a commune in the Mayenne department in north-western France.  Prior to October 6, 2008, it was known as Livré.

Geography
The river Oudon forms most of the commune's eastern border.

References

See also
Communes of the Mayenne department

Communes of Mayenne